The 2016–17 South Carolina Gamecocks women's basketball team represents the University of South Carolina during the 2016–17 NCAA Division I women's basketball season. The Gamecocks, led by ninth year head coach Dawn Staley, play their home games at the Colonial Life Arena and were members of the Southeastern Conference. They finished the season 33–4, 11–2 in SEC play to win the SEC regular season and tournament championship to earn an automatic bid to the NCAA women's tournament. They defeated UNC Ashville and Arizona State in the first and second rounds, Quinnipiac in the sweet sixteen and Florida State in the elite eight to advanced to their 2nd final four in school history. In the national semi final in Dallas they defeated Stanford and beat SEC rival Mississippi State in the final to win their first NCAA National Championship. A'ja Wilson was named the Most Outstanding Player in the National Championship Game.

Roster

Schedule

|-
!colspan=9 style="background:#73000A; color:#FFFFFF;" | Exhibition

|-
!colspan=9 style="background:#73000A; color:#FFFFFF;"| Regular season

|-
!colspan=9 style="background:#73000A; color:#FFFFFF;" | SEC women's tournament

|-
!colspan=9 style="background:#73000A; color:#FFFFFF;" | NCAA women's tournament

Rankings

Team players drafted into the WNBA

See also
 2016–17 South Carolina Gamecocks men's basketball team

References

South Carolina Gamecocks women's basketball seasons
South Carolina
South Carolina
NCAA Division I women's basketball tournament Final Four seasons
NCAA Division I women's basketball tournament championship seasons